Duchess of Bedford is a title given to the wife of the Duke of Bedford, an extant title in the peerage of England which was first created in 1414.

Duchesses of Bedford
1st creation (1414)
Anne of Burgundy (1404–1432), 1st wife of John of Lancaster, 1st Duke of Bedford
Jacquetta of Luxembourg (1415/16–1472), 2nd wife of John of Lancaster, 1st Duke of Bedford

5th creation (1485)
Catherine Woodville, Duchess of Buckingham (c.1458–1497), wife of Jasper Tudor, 1st Duke of Bedford

6th creation (1694)
Elizabeth Howland (1682–1724), wife of Wriothesley Russell, 2nd Duke of Bedford
Anne Russell, Duchess of Bedford (Lady Anne Egerton) (c.1705–1762), wife of Wriothesley Russell, 3rd Duke of Bedford
Diana Russell, Duchess of Bedford (Lady Diana Spencer) (1710–1735), 1st wife of John Russell, 4th Duke of Bedford
Hon. Gertrude Russell, Duchess of Bedford (1715-1794), 2nd wife of John Russell, 4th Duke of Bedford
Georgiana Russell, Duchess of Bedford (Lady Georgiana Gordon) (1781–1853), 2nd wife of John Russell, 6th Duke of Bedford
Anna Russell, Duchess of Bedford (Anna Maria Stanhope) (1783–1857), wife of Francis Russell, 7th Duke of Bedford
Elizabeth Russell, Duchess of Bedford (Lady Elizabeth Sackville-West) (1818–1897), wife of Francis Russell, 9th Duke of Bedford
Adeline Marie Russell, Duchess of Bedford (Lady Adeline Marie Somers) (1852–1920), wife of George Russell, 10th Duke of Bedford 
Mary Russell, Duchess of Bedford (Mary du Caurroy Tribe) (1865–1937), wife of Herbrand Russell, 11th Duke of Bedford
Louisa Russell, Duchess of Bedford (Louisa Whitwell) (1893–1960), wife of Hastings Russell, 12th Duke of Bedford
Lydia Lyle (1917–2006), 2nd wife of Ian Russell, 13th Duke of Bedford
Nicole Russell, Duchess of Bedford (Nicole Milinaire) (1920–2012), 3rd wife of Ian Russell, 13th Duke of Bedford
Henrietta Russell, Duchess of Bedford (b.1940) (née Henrietta Joan Tiarks), wife of Robin Russell, 14th Duke of Bedford
Louise Rona Crammond (b.1962), wife of Andrew Russell, 15th Duke of Bedford